As the Kingdom Drowns is the seventh studio album by Australian technical death metal band Psycroptic. It was released on 9 November 2018 by EVP Recordings in Australia and Prosthetic Records in North America.

Track listing

Personnel
Psycroptic
 Todd Stern - bass
 David Haley - drums
 Joe Haley - guitars
 Jason Peppiatt - vocals
 Amy Wiles - additional vocals

Production and artwork
 Joe Haley - production, engineering, mixing
 Mariusz Lewandowski - cover artwork
 Sam Dishington - layout
 Will Putney - mastering

References

External links
 iTunes - Music - As the Kingdom Drowns by Psycroptic

2018 albums
Psycroptic albums
Century Media Records albums